Brotherly Love is a 1985 American-Canadian television film directed by Jeff Bleckner, written by Ernest Tidyman and starring Judd Hirsch (in a dual role).  It is based on the 1981 novel of the same name by William D. Blankenship.  The film is dedicated to the memory of Tidyman, who died a year before the film's premiere.

Plot

Cast

Production
The film was shot in Vancouver.

References

External links
 
 

1985 television films
1985 films
1980s English-language films
Films shot in Vancouver
Films based on American novels
CBS network films
Television shows based on American novels
Canadian drama television films
English-language Canadian films
Films directed by Jeff Bleckner
American drama television films
1980s American films
1980s Canadian films